Xoser is a genus of moths belonging to the subfamily Tortricinae of the family Tortricidae.

Species
Xoser astonyx Razowski & Wojtusiak, 2010
Xoser exors Razowski & Pelz, 2003

See also
List of Tortricidae genera

References

 , 2005: World Catalogue of Insects 5 Tortricidae.
 , 2003: Tortricidae collected in Ecuador in the years 1996–1999: Euliini (Lepidoptera). Nachrichten des Entomologischen Vereins Apollo NF 24(4): 189–207.
 , 2010: Some Tortricidae from the East Cordillera in Ecuador reared from larvae in Yanayacu Biological Station in Ecuador (Insecta: Lepidoptera). Genus 21 (4): 585–603. Full article: .

External links
Tortricid.net

Euliini
Tortricidae genera